Cathedral Mountain may refer to:

Cathedral Mountain (Australia), a mountain in Tasmania, Australia
Cathedral Mountain (North Shore Mountains), one of the North Shore Mountains just outside Vancouver
Cathedral Mountain (Yoho), a mountain in Yoho National Park, British Columbia
Mount Meager (British Columbia), a mountain in southwestern British Columbia, Canada
Cathedral Mountain (Texas), near Alpine
Cathedral Mountain in Gloss Mountain State Park in Oklahoma.
Cathedral Mountain (Zion), a mountain in Zion National Park, Utah